Social video marketing is a component of an integrated marketing communications plan designed to increase audience engagement through social activity around a given video. In a successful social video marketing campaign, the content, distribution strategy and consumer self-expression tools combine to allow an individual to “add their voice” or co-create value to a piece of content - then further disseminate it out to their social acquaintances. Social video typically benefits from a halo effect cast by the "influencers” of a given social grouping. Social video marketing draws on consumer-culture theory, economic theory, and social theory around the psychology of sharing. Social video marketing differs from social marketing, which has the intent of influencing behavior for a social good.

Media publishers and content rights holders create social videos from TV, live video feeds and pre-recorded content in order to generate engagement on social platforms and drive media distribution. They use real-time video editing software to instantly create and share social videos in native formats such as vertical video for Snapchat and square video for Instagram.

Distinguished from viral video marketing

Social video marketing is also distinct from viral marketing which is more closely aligned with the self-replicating nature of both “memorable and sufficiently” interesting content. In contrast to viral video where success is typically measured solely on the pass-along rate or the number of impressions, social video hinges upon leveraging a deeper more contextual relationship between sharer and recipient.

Social videos tends to be passed along because of a shared interest or a sense of trust between sender and recipient(s). Social videos attract conversation in either a one-to-one or a one-many relationship, with the comments and interactions becoming cumulative, rather than moving in a one-way trajectory, as in the case of not a viral video.

Social video marketing tools/software
 Hulu
 Justin.tv
 SoundCloud (audio only)
 Viddler
 Magisto 
 Facebook
 Instagram
 Snapchat
 Grabyo
 fiverr
 Twitter
 Rumble

Theories on social video and sharing

Historical context

Conditions which have made the market conducive to the rise of social video marketing:

 Falling cost of technology
 Cameras' ubiquity
 Increase of bandwidth and consumer access
 Computer speed/RAM
 Desktop publishing
 Rise of social networking sites

Current research
In a 2011 study published in Psychological Science, a journal of the Association for Psychological Science, Jonah Berger found that subjects the sharing of stories or information may be driven in part by arousal. When people are physiologically aroused, whether due to emotional stimuli or otherwise, the autonomic nervous is activated, which then boosts social transmission. Simply put, evoking certain emotions can help increase the chance a message is shared.

“In a prior paper, we found that emotion plays a big role in which New York Times articles make the most emailed list. But interestingly, we found that while articles evoking more positive emotions were generally more viral, some negative emotions like anxiety and anger actually increased transmission while others like sadness decreased it. In trying to understand why, it seemed like arousal might be a key factor,” says Berger, the Joseph G. Campbell Jr. Assistant Professor of Marketing at the University of Pennsylvania.

In the study, Berger suggests that feeling fearful, angry, or amused drives people to share news and information. These types of emotions are characterized by high arousal and action, as opposed to emotions like sadness or contentment, which are characterized by low arousal or inaction. “If something makes you angry as opposed to sad, for example, you’re more likely to share it with your family and friends because you’re fired up,” continues Berger.

Bibliography and References

“Why Do We Share Stories, News, and Information With Others?” - Psychological Science [3]

Notes 

Viral marketing
Memetics
Promotion and marketing communications
Digital marketing